The second season of the Russian reality talent show The Voice Senior (The Voice. 60+) premiered on September 13, 2019 on Channel One. Pelageya and Lev Leshchenko returned as coaches, while Mikhail Boyarsky and Valeriya replaced Leonid Agutin and Valery Meladze. Dmitry Nagiev returned as the show's presenter.

Leonid Sergienko was named winner of this season, marking Pelageya's second win as a coach, and maintaining her winning streak from last season. This also makes Pelageya the first female coach to win more than one season.

Coaches and presenter

Pelageya and Lev Leshchenko returned as coaches for their 2nd season in a row. Agutin and Meladze did not return for season two and were replaced by Valeriya and Mikhail Boyarsky, thus making it the first season to have two female coaches.

Dmitry Nagiev also returned as a presenter.

Teams
Colour key

Blind auditions
Colour key

The coaches performed "Поворот" at the start of the show.

The Knockouts
The Knockouts round aired on September 27, 2019. This stage was pre-recorded at Mosfilm on September 12, 2019.

The top 8 contestants then moved on to the "Live Season Finale."

Colour key

Final
Colour key

Reception

Rating

References

2019 Russian television seasons